Volodymyr Atamas (born 15 July 1950) is a Soviet sprinter. He competed in the men's 100 metres at the 1972 Summer Olympics.

References

External links
 

1950 births
Living people
Athletes (track and field) at the 1972 Summer Olympics
Soviet male sprinters
Olympic athletes of the Soviet Union
Universiade silver medalists for the Soviet Union
Universiade medalists in athletics (track and field)